Gauss–Markov stochastic processes (named after Carl Friedrich Gauss and Andrey Markov) are stochastic processes that satisfy the requirements for both Gaussian processes and Markov processes. A stationary Gauss–Markov process is unique up to rescaling; such a process is also known as an Ornstein–Uhlenbeck process.

Gauss–Markov processes obey Langevin equations.

Basic properties
Every Gauss–Markov process X(t) possesses the three following properties:
 If h(t) is a non-zero scalar function of t, then Z(t) = h(t)X(t) is also a Gauss–Markov process
 If f(t) is a non-decreasing scalar function of t, then Z(t) = X(f(t)) is also a Gauss–Markov process
 If the process is non-degenerate and mean-square continuous, then there exists a non-zero scalar function h(t) and a strictly increasing scalar function f(t) such that X(t) = h(t)W(f(t)), where W(t) is the standard Wiener process.
Property (3) means that every non-degenerate mean-square continuous Gauss–Markov process can be synthesized from the standard Wiener process (SWP).

Other properties

A stationary Gauss–Markov process with variance  and time constant  has the following properties.
 Exponential autocorrelation: 
 A power spectral density (PSD) function that has the same shape as the Cauchy distribution:  (Note that the Cauchy distribution and this spectrum differ by scale factors.)
 The above yields the following spectral factorization: which is important in Wiener filtering and other areas.

There are also some trivial exceptions to all of the above.

References

Markov processes